HC 07 Detva is an ice hockey team playing in the Slovak 2. Liga, and formed in 2007. They play in the city of Detva, Slovakia at Detva Ice Stadium.

History
The club was founded in 2007. In the 2017–18 season did not qualify for the playoffs, it was first season for Detva in Slovak Extraliga. In relegation series they finished on second place and will play in Slovak Extraliga next season. In the 2018–19 season they first time qualified to quarterfinal, when lost with champions of the league HC '05 Banská Bystrica 1–4 in the series.

Honours

Domestic

Slovak 1. Liga
  Winners (2): 2014–15, 2016–17

Slovak 2. Liga
  Winners (1): 2007–08

References

External links
Official website 

2007 establishments in Slovakia
Detva
Ice hockey clubs established in 2007